Sidney Lau romanisation is a system of romanisation for Cantonese that was developed in the 1970s by Sidney Lau for teaching Cantonese to Hong Kong Government expatriates.  It is based on the Hong Kong Government's Standard Romanisation which was the result of the work of James D. Ball and Ernst J. Eitel about a century earlier.

Innovation
Lau's singular creative step was to indicate tonality with superscript numbers so as to do away with diacritics entirely. His system was a plain attempt at simplification which proved popular with western learners of Cantonese as a second language and was initially the system of romanisation adopted by the University of Hong Kong. However, the university now employs the Jyutping system for its Cantonese courses.

Initials

Finals 
In his system, Lau treats /ɵ/ and /o/ as allophones of one phoneme represented with "u", while they are often respectively regarded as allophones of /œ:/ and /u:/ in other systems.

Tones

1° indicates the high flat tone. If ° appears after any other tones, it signifies a changed tone and that the word is to be pronounced as 1°, but 1° is not the original/normal tone of the word. Similar to °, if * appears after any tones apart from tone 2, it indicates that the word is to be pronounced as tone 2, but tone 2 is not the original/normal tone of the word.

References

External links
Explanation of Sidney Lau's Cantonese Romanization System
Cantonese writing, with information on Sidney Lau romanisation
Cukda Cantonese IME

Cantonese romanisation